Juan Alberto Díaz Rodríguez (born November 8, 1985 in San Salvador, El Salvador) is a Salvadoran footballer.

Club career
Díaz learned his trade at the José Luis Rugamas football school where he started playing when 8 years of age. He made his professional debut ten years later in 2003 with third division side  Vendaval, then moved to giants FAS. He had a short spell at San Salvador before joining hometown club  Nejapa. Another short stay at second division Marte Soyapango followed and he most recently played for Atlético Balboa.

International career
He made his debut for El Salvador in a November 2006 friendly match against Bolivia and has earned a total of 9 caps, scoring 1 goal. He has represented his country at the 2007 UNCAF Nations Cup 

His final international was an April 2007 friendly match against Haiti.

International goals
Scores and results list El Salvador's goal tally first.

References

External links

Player profile - CD FAS

1985 births
Living people
Sportspeople from San Salvador
Association football forwards
Salvadoran footballers
El Salvador international footballers
C.D. FAS footballers
San Salvador F.C. footballers
Nejapa footballers
Atlético Balboa footballers
2007 UNCAF Nations Cup players